Alma Jeets (7 November 1896 Viljandi – 9 February 1979) was an Estonian politician. She was a member of Estonian National Assembly.

Jeets was arrested by the NKVD in 1944 and sentenced to five years in a prison camp in Siberia, where she survived due to medical knowledge acquired in the Women's Home Guard (Naiskodukaitse, or NKK), which she had been a member since 1928. In 1949, she was permitted to return to Estonia and initially lived in Riisipere. Later, with her family, she settled in Tallinn.

References

1896 births
1979 deaths
People from Viljandi
People from Kreis Fellin
Members of the Estonian National Assembly
Estonian prisoners and detainees
Prisoners and detainees of the Soviet Union
Gulag detainees
Burials at Pärnamäe Cemetery